Comedian Kathy Griffin has released 20 television specials, three original comedy albums, and one concert film.

Television

HBO

Bravo

Film

Albums

Original albums

Television specials released as albums
Kathy Griffin Does the Bible Belt - August 9, 2010
Kathy Griffin: 50 and Not Pregnant - July 18, 2011
Kathy Griffin: Seaman 1st Class - August 20, 2012
Kathy Griffin: Calm Down Gurrl - August 6, 2013

Awards and nominations

Home video
Kathy Griffin: Allegedly - November 30, 2004
Kathy Griffin Is... Not Nicole Kidman - June 12, 2007. Included on the season 1 set of Kathy Griffin: My Life on the D-List.
Kathy Griffin: She'll Cut a Bitch - January 12, 2010
Kathy Griffin: Pants Off/Tired Hooker - August 7, 2012 (Region 1)
The Kathy Griffin Collection: Red, White & Raw - October 30, 2012. Contains seven of Kathy's Bravo specials including Balls of Steel, Does the Bible Belt, Whores on Crutches, 50 and Not Pregnant, Gurrl Down, Pants Off and Tired Hooker. (Region 1)
Kathy Griffin: A Hell of a Story - August 13, 2019

References

Kathy Griffin